Hervé Della Maggiore (born 17 August 1972) is a French former footballer who played as a midfielder, and is the coach of French club FC Villefranche.

Managerial career
Della Maggiore was a youth product of Olympique Lyonnais, and had an unassuming career as a semi-amateur footballer. Della Maggiore begun his managerial career with Bourg-en-Bresse in 2008, when the team played in the Championnat National 3, the fifth division in French football. During his tenure, he helped Bourg-en-Bresse reach the Ligue 2, becoming the first team in the Ain département in France to do so.

He left Bourg-en-Bresse after the club were relegated to the Championnat National in 2018.

In October 2018 he joined Gazélec Ajaccio as new manager. He left at the end of the 2018–19 season after the club lost the Ligue 2 relegation play-off and were relegated to Championnat National.

On 11 February 2021, he was named as new coach of FC Villefranche in the Championnat National

Managerial statistics

Personal life
Della Maggiore was born in Lyon to an affluent Italian family.

References

External links 
L'Equipe Profile

1972 births
Living people
People from Rillieux-la-Pape
Association football midfielders
French footballers
French football managers
French people of Italian descent
Ligue 2 managers
Football Bourg-en-Bresse Péronnas 01 managers
Ain Sud players
Sportspeople from Lyon Metropolis
Footballers from Auvergne-Rhône-Alpes